Muotka's Council is the incumbent governing council of the Sámi Parliament of Norway, headed by the President Silje Karine Muotka of the Norwegian Sámi Association. The governing council was installed on 21 October 2021, following the 2021 Norwegian Sámi parliamentary election. It is a coalition council consisting of the Norwegian Sámi Association, the Centre Party, and the Ávjovári Moving Sámi List, known as the Beaiveálgu coalition.

Responsibilities
The Governing Council heads the executive branch of the Sami parliamentary system in Norway. The President of the Sami Parliament is the head of the executive branch. The Governing Council is composed by the President and four other council members. They hold full-time positions and are responsible for the daily political business of the Sami Parliament.

List of councillors 

|}

See also
 Sámi politics
 Sámi Parliament of Norway
 Sámi Parliament of Finland
 Sámi Parliament of Sweden
 Sámi Parliament of Russia
 Elections in Norway

References

Politics of Norway
Sámi in Norway
Parliament
Organisations based in Finnmark